The 2017 USC Trojans football team represented the University of Southern California in the 2017 NCAA Division I FBS football season. They played their home games at the Los Angeles Memorial Coliseum as members of the South Division of the Pac-12 Conference. They were led by second-year head coach Clay Helton. They finished the season 11–3, 8–1 in Pac-12 play to be champions of the South Division. They represented the South Division in the Pac-12 Championship Game where they defeated Stanford to become Pac-12 Champions. They were invited to play in the Cotton Bowl where they were soundly defeated at the hands of Ohio State, 24–7.

Personnel

Coaching staff

Roster

Returning starters

USC returns 26 starters in 2017, including 12 on offense, 11 on defense, and 3 on special teams.

Key departures include Justin Davis (TB – 6 games), JuJu Smith-Schuster (WR – 13 games), Darreus Rogers (WR – 13 games), De'Quan Hampton (WR), Isaac Whitney (WR), Taylor McNamara (TE – 11 games), Zach Banner (OT – 11 games), Chad Wheeler (OT – 11 games), Damien Mama (OL – 12 games), Jordan Simmons (OL – 2 games), Stevie Tu'ikolovatu (DT – 12 games), Quinton Powell (LB), Michael Hutchings (ILB – 13 games), Adoree' Jackson (CB – 13 games), Leon McQuay III (S – 12 games), Zach Smith (LS – 13 games).

Other departures include Joel Foy (LB),  Deion Hart (S).

Offense (12)

Defense (12)

Special teams (3)

Transfers
The Trojans lost 5 players due to transfer. One transfer during the 2017 season.

Depth chart

Projecting Depth Chart 2017

True Freshman
Double Position : *

Recruiting class

Scholarship distribution chart 

 /  / * : Former walk-on

- 85 scholarships permitted, 85 currently allotted to players.

- USC can sign 15-20 players in the class of 2018 count contingent on 9 graduating SRs (Lockett and Tucker burned redshirt in 2017), NFL early entries and transfers.

Projecting Scholarship Distribution 2017

2017 NFL Draft

NFL Combine
The official list of participants for the 2017 NFL Combine was released on Wednesday (February 15), featuring USC football players OT Zach Banner, TB Justin Davis, CB Adoree’ Jackson, OG Damien Mama, WR Darreus Rogers, WR JuJu Smith-Schuster, NT Stevie Tu’ikolovatu and OT Chad Wheeler.

The eight Trojans were tested at the Combine in Indianapolis beginning on February 28 through March 6.

Trojans who didn't nab an invite include S Leon McQuay III, TE Taylor McNamara, LB Michael Hutchings, LB Quinton Powell, OG Jordan Simmons, WR De'Quan Hampton, WR Isaac Whitney & LS Zach Smith. They waited until USC's Pro Day to get in front of NFL scouts

Team players drafted into the NFL

Schedule

Game summaries

Western Michigan

No. 14 Stanford

Texas

California

No. 16 Washington State

Oregon State

Utah

No. 13 Notre Dame

Arizona State

No. 22 Arizona

Colorado

USC clinches Pac-12 South Division title with the win.

UCLA

Pac-12 Championship Game

Cotton Bowl

Rankings

Statistics

Team
As of 10/21/2017.

Non-conference opponents

Pac-12 opponents

All Opponents

Offense

Defense

Key: POS: Position, SOLO: Solo Tackles, AST: Assisted Tackles, TOT: Total Tackles, TFL: Tackles-for-loss, SACK: Quarterback Sacks, INT: Interceptions, BU: Passes Broken Up, PD: Passes Defended, QBH: Quarterback Hits, FR: Fumbles Recovered, FF: Forced Fumbles, BLK: Kicks or Punts Blocked, SAF: Safeties, TD : Touchdown

Special teams

Awards and honors

Coaches
Clay Helton - Head coach
 Associated Press PAC-I2 Coach of the Year : Winner
Dodd Trophy (Division I head coach whose team excels on the field, in the classroom and in the community) : Watchlist

Tee Martin - Offensive coordinator/Wide Receivers coach
Broyles Award (Award given to honor the best assistant coach in college football) : Semifinalist

Offense
Sam Darnold - QB -  Sophomore
Maxwell Award (College football player of the year) : Semifinalist
Davey O'Brien Award (best of all NCAA quarterbacks) : Semifinalist
Walter Camp Award (Player of the Year in college football) : Semifinalist

Ronald Jones II - TB - Junior
Doak Walker Award (The nation's top college football running back) : Semifinalist

Vavae Malepeai - TB -  Freshman
Polynesian College Football Player of the Year : Watchlist

Deontay Burnett - WR - Junior
Biletnikoff Award (The nation's top college football wide receiver) : Semifinalist

Daniel Imatorbhebhe - TE -  Sophomore
John Mackey Award (College football's most outstanding tight end) : Watchlist

Toa Lobendahn - OT/C - Senior
Polynesian College Football Player of the Year : Watchlist

Viane Talamaivao - OG - Senior
Polynesian College Football Player of the Year : Watchlist

Nico Falah - C -  Senior
Wuerffel Trophy (college football player "who best combines exemplary community service with athletic and academic achievement") : Watchlist

Defense
Rasheem Green - DT - Junior
Bronko Nagurski Trophy (best defensive player in NCAA college football) : Watchlist
Outland Trophy (Best interior lineman in college football) : Watchlist

Porter Gustin - LB - Junior
Bednarik Award (College defensive player of the year) : Watchlist
Butkus Award (top linebacker in college football) : Watchlist

Cameron Smith - LB - Junior
Bronko Nagurski Trophy (best defensive player in NCAA college football) : Watchlist
Bednarik Award (College defensive player of the year) : Watchlist
Butkus Award (top linebacker in college football) : Semifinalist

Uchenna Nwosu - LB - Senior
Butkus Award (top linebacker in college football) : Watchlist

Iman Marshall - CB - Junior
Bronko Nagurski Trophy (best defensive player in NCAA college football) : Watchlist
Bednarik Award (College defensive player of the year) : Watchlist
Jim Thorpe Award (top defensive back in college football) : Watchlist

Special Team
Chris Tilbey - P -  Junior
Ray Guy Award (College football's top punter) : Watchlist

Jake Olson - LS -  Junior
Jason Witten Collegiate Man Of The Year Award (leadership by exhibiting exceptional courage, integrity and sportsmanship both on and off the field) : Semifinalist. During the season, Olson became the first blind Division I player.

AP Pre-Season All-Americans
First Team
Sam Darnold - QB -  Freshman

Second Team
Cameron Smith - ILB - Sophomore
Iman Marshall - CB - Sophomore

College Sports Madness All-American Team

All-Pac-12 Individual Awards

PAC-12 All-Conference Team
First Team
Sam Darnold - QB -  Sophomore
Ronald Jones II - TB - Junior
Rasheem Green - DT - Junior
Uchenna Nwosu - OLB - Senior
Cameron Smith - ILB - Junior
Marvell Tell - S - Junior
Michael Pittman Jr. - ST - Sophomore

Second Team
Deontay Burnett - WR - Junior
Toa Lobendahn - OT - Senior
Christian Rector - DT -  Sophomore
Matt Lopes - ST - Senior

Honorable Mention
Stephen Carr - TB - Freshman
Steven Mitchell - WR -  Senior
Tyler Vaughns - WR -  Freshman
Tyler Petite - TE - Junior
Chris Brown - OG -  Junior
Josh Fatu - DT - Senior
Brandon Pili - DT - Freshman
Iman Marshall - CB - Junior
Chris Hawkins - S -  Senior

PAC-12 All-Freshman Team

PAC-12 All-Academic Team

USA Today Sports Freshman All-America Team

Sporting News 2017 college football preseason All-Americans
First Team
Sam Darnold - QB -  Sophomore
Cameron Smith - LB - Junior

Notes
 January 2, 2017 – Rose Bowl Final Score: USC Topples Penn State.
 January 2, 2017 – How USC Won the Rose Bowl Over Penn State.
 January 2, 2017 – Past Trojans Hyped Over Rose Bowl Win.
 January 2, 2017 – Trojans Celebrate Rose Bowl.
 January 4, 2017 – LB Cameron Smith Suspended for 1st Half of 2017 Opener.
 January 4, 2017 – USC's Sam Darnold Wins Archie Griffin Award As 2016 CFB MVP.
 January 5, 2017 – OG Jordan Simmons Denied 6th Year Of Eligibility.
 January 6, 2017 – Damien Mama Declares for the 2017 NFL Draft, Leaving USC Early.
 January 7, 2017 – 4-star 2018 WR Allen commits to USC.
 January 7, 2017 – Bubba Bolden Re-Commits To USC Football Recruiting Class of 2017.
 January 7, 2017 – JuJu Smith-Schuster Declares For 2017 NFL Draft, Leaving USC Football Early.
 January 9, 2017 – Matt Leinart Named To 2017 College Football Hall of Fame Class.
 January 9, 2017 – Clay Helton Named FWAA First Year Coach of Year.
 January 9, 2017 – USC Football Has Third-Best Odds To Win 2017 National Championship.
 January 9, 2017 – USC Football Ranked High in ESPN's Way Too Early Top 25.
 January 10, 2017 – USC Football Ranks in Final AP Top 5 For First Time Since 2008.
 January 10, 2017 – 3-Star WR Marlon Williams De-Commits.
 January 11, 2017 – Trojans Welcome 2017 Early Enrollees.
 January 15, 2017 – Je’Quari Godfrey Commits To 2017 USC Football Recruiting Class.
 January 16, 2017 – Adoree’ Jackson Declares Early For 2017 NFL Draft, Leaving USC Football.
 January 16, 2017 – Jalen McKenzie Commits to 2017 USC Recruiting Class.
 January 18, 2017 – 2017 USC Football Schedule Released: No Regular Season Bye Week For Trojans.
 January 18, 2017 – C.J. Miller De-Commits From 2017 Class.
 January 20, 2017 – Juwan Burgess flips from USC to Indiana.
 January 22, 2017 – Brandon Pili Commits to the 2017 USC Football Recruiting Class.
 January 23, 2017 – Marlon Tuipulotu flips from Washington to USC.
 January 27, 2017 – Isaiah Pola-Mao Commits To 2017 USC Football Recruiting Class.
 January 29, 2017 – Khaliel Rodgers To Transfer To Iowa State.
 January 30, 2017 – USC Signing Day 2017: Announcement Schedule and TV Times.
 January 30, 2017 – DT Marlon Tuipulotu Completes Early Enrollment.
 February 1, 2017 – Levi Jones Selects USC on ESPNU's Signing Day Special.
 February 1, 2017 – Austin Jackson Selects USC Football on Signing Day.
 February 1, 2017 – Jay Tufele Selects USC Football Over Utah On Signing Day.
 February 1, 2017 – Josh Falo Selects USC Football on Signing Day 2017.
 February 1, 2017 – Joseph Lewis Selects USC Football Over Nebraska On Signing Day.
 February 1, 2017 – Greg Johnson Selects USC Football On Signing Day.
 February 4, 2017 – Terrance Lang Signs With Colorado.
 February 7, 2017 – Running Backs Coach Tommie Robinson Leaves USC Football to Join LSU.
 February 16, 2017 – USC Football Sending Eight Trojans to the 2017 NFL Combine.
 February 19, 2017 – Palaie Gaoteote Commits to USC's 2018 Recruiting Class.
 February 20, 2017 – USC Football: Sam Darnold Oddsmaker's Favorite To Win Heisman.
 February 22, 2017 – Indiana RB Coach Deland McCullough Reportedly Targeted By USC Football.
 February 22, 2017 – USC Commit Matt Corral Transferring to Long Beach Poly.
 February 22, 2017 – Deland McCullough to be Hired by USC as Running Backs Coach.
 February 24, 2017 – Manuel Allen decommits from 2018 USC recruiting class.
 March 3, 2017 – New Running Backs Coach Deland McCullough.
 March 6, 2017 – Noah Jefferson To Transfer To Arizona.
 March 11, 2017 – Kicker Chase McGrath Commits For 2017.
 April 2, 2017 – Tayler Katoa to Miss 2017 USC Football Season With Torn ACL.
 April 3, 2017 – De’Gabriel Floyd Commits to USC Football Recruiting Class of 2019.
 April 23, 2017 – Tuli Letuligasenoa Commits to USC Football's 2018 Recruiting Class.
 April 27, 2017 – Adoree’ Jackson Picked By Tennessee Titans In First Round of 2017 NFL Draft.
 April 28, 2017 – JuJu Smith-Schuster Picked By Pittsburgh Steelers In Second Round of 2017 NFL Draft.
 April 29, 2017 – Zach Banner Picked By Indianapolis Colts In 4th Round of 2017 NFL Draft.
 April 29, 2017 – Leon McQuay III Picked By Kansas City Chiefs In 6th Round of 2017 NFL Draft.
 April 29, 2017 – USC Becomes First School to Have 500 All-Time NFL Draft Picks.
 April 29, 2017 – Stevie Tu’ikolovatu Picked By Tampa Bay Buccaneers In 7th Round of 2017 NFL Draft.
 April 30, 2017 – Darreus Rogers Signs With Seattle Seahawks As Undrafted Free Agent.
 April 30, 2017 – Isaac Whitney Signs With Oakland Raiders as Undrafted Free Agent.
 April 30, 2017 – Chad Wheeler Signs With New York Giants as Undrafted Free Agent.
 April 30, 2017 – Jordan Simmons Signs With Oakland Raiders As Undrafted Free Agent.
 April 30, 2017 – Damien Mama Signs With KC Chiefs as Undrafted Free Agent.
 April 30, 2017 – Justin Davis Signs With LA Rams as Undrafted Free Agent.
 April 30, 2017 – Quinton Powell Signs With New Orleans Saints as Undrafted Free Agent.
 April 30, 2017 – De’Quan Hampton Signs With Detroit Lions As Undrafted Free Agent.
 April 30, 2017 – Taylor McNamara Signs With Cleveland Browns as Undrafted Free Agent.
 April 30, 2017 – Former ASU DT Dillon Faamatau Commits To USC Football.
 April 30, 2017 – Sam Darnold Is Consensus No. 1 Pick in 2018 NFL Mock Drafts.
 June 6, 2017 – Dillon Faamatau flips to Oklahoma.

References

USC
USC Trojans football seasons
Pac-12 Conference football champion seasons
USC Trojans football
USC Trojans football